Railway Ecological Golf Club is the one of the prominent golf course club in India that comes under Eastern Railway, Jamalpur Dist., Munger, Bihar and has been affiliated to Indian Golf Union.

History 
Railway Ecological Club was built around 1912 as a recreational 9- hole affairs by the British making it one of the oldest Golf Course Club of India. Initially, it was named 'Central Institute Golf Club', which was renamed REGC in 2005 to gain more publicity for Indian Railway. In 2005 only, it was re-created as 18 hole Championship Course by adding more holes.

The longest running tournaments at the REGC were Instituted by British- The Monsoon Cup 1912 and The Jamalpur Golf trophy in 1913 presented by B. Sinclair Wedderburn. Both the trophies are kept at RECG memorabilia.

Detailing 

RCGC has an 18-hole golf course with the following detail:

Yardage: 5743
Par: 70
Rating: 67.0
Mostly flat terrain, small greens and natural water hazards.

References

External links 
blog on Railway Ecological Club Jamalpur

Sport in Bihar
Golf clubs and courses in India
Sports clubs in Bihar
Sports clubs established in the 1900s
1912 establishments in India